Mexicayotl (Nahuatl word meaning "Essence of the Mexican", "Mexicanity"; Spanish: Mexicanidad; see -yotl) is a movement reviving the indigenous religion, philosophy and traditions of ancient Mexico (Aztec religion and Aztec philosophy) among the Mexican people.

The movement came to light in the 1950s, led by Mexico City intellectuals otherwise known as the descendants of The Aztec Triple Alliance Elite.

History
The Mexicayotl movement started in the 1950s with the founding of the group Nueva Mexicanidad by Antonio Velasco Piña. In the same years Rodolfo Nieva López founded the Movimiento Confederado Restaurador de la Cultura del Anáhuac, the co-founder of which was Francisco Jimenez Sanchez who in later decades became a spiritual leader of the Mexicayotl movement, endowed with the honorific Tlacaelel. He had a deep influence in shaping the movement, founding the In Kaltonal ("House of the Sun", also called Native Mexican Church) in the 1970s.

From the 1970s onwards Mexicayotl has grown developing in a web of local worship and community groups (called calpulli or kalpulli)<ref name="Rostas">Susanna E. Rostas. Mexicanidad: The Resurgence of the Indian in Popular Mexican Nationalism. University of Cambridge, 1997.</ref> and spreading to the Mexican Americans or Chicanos in the United States. It has also developed strong ties with Mexican national identity movements and Chicano nationalism. Sanchez's Native Mexican Church (which is a confederation of calpullis'') was officially recognised by the government of Mexico in 2007.

See also
 Aztec religion
 Mesoamerican religion
 Religion in Mexico
 Toltecayotl

References

External links
 In Kaltonal
 Kalpulli Xochicuicatl

Chicano nationalism
Indigenous Mexican American culture
Indigenous nationalism in the Americas
Indigenous peoples in Mexico City
Indigenous politics in North America
Mesoamerican mythology and religion
Mexican nationalism
New religious movements
Religion in Mexico
Religion in the United States